Kevin McLaughlin is an American scholar of comparative literature, currently the George Hazard Crooker Distinguished University Professor of English, Professor of comparative studies and German studies, and Dean of the Faculty at Brown University. He is also a published author.

McLaughlin has also held two other named professorships, the Nicholas Brown Professor of Oratory and Belles Lettres from 2005 to 2011, and the Manning Endowed Professor of English and Comparative Literature from 1997 to 2000.

References

21st-century American historians
21st-century American male writers
Brown University faculty
Professors of German in the United States
New York University alumni
Cornell University faculty
Academic staff of the National Tsing Hua University
Year of birth missing (living people)
Living people
American male non-fiction writers